James Alexander Nash  (10 January 1923 – 28 March 1944) was an Australian rules footballer who played for the Hawthorn Football Club in the Victorian Football League (VFL).

Family
The son of Stanley Nash, and Myra Lucille Nash, née McIntosh, James Alexander Nash was born at Carlton, Victoria on 10 January 1923.

Football
His only VFL game, which was against Collingwood, was while he was on leave from Royal Australian Air Force (RAAF) duties.

Military service
A notable pilot, he was awarded the Distinguished Flying Medal for his efforts during the Second World War; the award was presented to his mother by William McKell, the Governor-General of Australia, at Government House, Melbourne, on 20 October 1947.

Death
He was killed in action off Bougainville, on 28 March 1944, when the bomber he was flying crashed into the sea in poor conditions and failing light while making a steep turn on his return to base after a strafing raid.

His body was never recovered. He is commemorated at the Rabaul War Cemetery.

See also
 List of Victorian Football League players who died in active service

Footnotes

References
 Holmesby, Russell & Main, Jim (2007). The Encyclopedia of AFL Footballers. 7th ed. Melbourne: Bas Publishing.
 World War Two Service Record: Pilot Officer James Alexander Nash (410368), National Archives of Australia.
 RAAF Documents relating to the crash of Beaufort A9-517 and the death of Pilot Officer James Alexander Nash (410368), National Archives of Australia.
 Roll of Honour: Pilot Officer James Alexander Nash (410368), at the Australian War Memorial.
 R.A.A.F. Casualty List: Australia and Territories: Missing, Air Operations, The Age, (Thursday, 27 April 1944), p.4.
 R.A.A.F. Casualties: South-West Pacific: Previously Reported Missing, Now Presumed Dead, The Age, (Tuesday, 29 May 1945), p.5.
 Pilot Officer James Alexander Nash, DFM (410368), Commonwealth War Graves Commission.

External links
 
 

1923 births
1940s missing person cases
1944 deaths
Australian military personnel killed in World War II
Australian rules footballers from Melbourne
Hawthorn Football Club players
Missing in action of World War II
Recipients of the Distinguished Flying Medal
Royal Australian Air Force officers
Royal Australian Air Force personnel of World War II
Military personnel from Melbourne
People from Carlton, Victoria